Pasaia is a town and municipality located in the province of Gipuzkoa in the Basque Autonomous Community of northern Spain. It is a fishing community, commercial port and the birthplace of the famous admiral Blas de Lezo and of the fashion designer Paco Rabanne.

The municipality numbers 16,056 inhabitants ( estimates), clustering around the Bay of Pasaia in four nuclei, namely Pasai San Pedro, Pasai San Juan (or Donibane in Basque), Antxo and Trintxerpe, with each part showing distinctive features.

History

Pasaia is mentioned in documentary records for the first time in 1203 as Oiarso. The name of the village was later changed to "Pasage", which means 'port' in Gascon. The Gascons had come to inhabit the area side by side with the Basque people at the beginning of the 13th century. The current name is first attested in the 15th century, when it was called the above "Pasage". 

It was a major source of revenue for the municipal coffers on the strength of its strategic position in the commercial sea-routes. It was the Guipuzcoana Company's main port, numbering up to seven shipyards in the mid-17th century. Historically the area was controlled by two competing baronies, i.e. Hondarribia, controlling Donibane, the right bank, and Donostia (San Sebastián), with jurisdiction over San Pedro, the left bank. Donibane detached from Hondarribia in 1770, and San Pedro segregated from Donostia in 1805. 

The district of Antxo was formed in 1890, when the Irun-Madrid railway came through. Trintxerpe, next to San Pedro, was the last district to form. Trintxerpe and Antxo make up a continuous urban strip with the eastern districts of the city of Donostia.

References

External links
 Official Website Information available in Spanish and Basque.
 PASAIA in the Bernardo Estornés Lasa - Auñamendi Encyclopedia (Euskomedia Fundazioa) Information available in Spanish

Municipalities in Gipuzkoa
Fishing communities
Port cities and towns on the Spanish Atlantic coast

This article is based in part on material from the Spanish Wikipedia.